Mathew Samuel Kalarickal is an Indian cardiologist widely known as the father of angioplasty in India. He specializes in coronary angioplasty, carotid stenting, coronary stenting and rotablator atherectomy.

Early years 
Kalarickal was born on 6 January 1948 in Kottayam, Kerala. He studied at Union Christian College, Aluva. Subsequently, he got his MBBS degree from Government Medical College, Kottayam in 1974, his MD from Stanley Medical College, Chennai in 1978 and his DM in 1981 from Madras Medical College, Chennai.

Career 
After starting his career in India, Kalarickal moved to Jakarta to work at Medistra Hospital, later he moved to Oman to work as a cardiologist at the Royal Hospital, Muscat. He continued his practice in the United States only to return to India in 1985 after training there under Andreas Gruentzig, who is known as the father of coronary angioplasty and joined Apollo Hospitals at Chennai.

Positions held 
Kalarickal is at present the Director, Interventional Cardiology and Cardiac Catheterisation Laboratories, Apollo Hospitals, Chennai. He is also a visiting Interventional Cardiologist at hospitals in different parts of India. He is the founder-convenor of the National Angioplasty Registry of India, which is a forum for interventional cardiologists of the country to learn from each other, streamline the standard of procedure and maintain international standards.
Kalarickal was the President, Asian-Pacific Society of Interventional Cardiology, from 1995 to 1997 and Chairman of Interventional Cardiology, Asian-Pacific Society of Cardiology, from 1995 to 1999.

Awards and recognitions 
 Doctor of Science Award by the Dr. M.G.R. University in 2003
 Padmashri by the President of India in 2000
 Dr. B. C. Roy Award in Interventional Cardiology in 1996
 "Rashtriya Samman" (top tax payers award) in 2000

References

Further reading 

1948 births
Living people
Recipients of the Padma Shri in medicine
Indian cardiologists
Dr. B. C. Roy Award winners
20th-century Indian medical doctors
Scientists from Kottayam
Medical doctors from Kerala